Zach Herrin (born November 17, 1995) is an American professional stock car racing driver who currently competes part-time in the ARCA Menards Series driving the No. 12 Toyota for Fast Track Racing.

Racing career

Early career 
Born in Glendale, California, Zach began racing motorcycles at the age of 5, competing in amateur championships until the age of 16. In 2012, Zach began his professional career in the AMA Pro SuperSport Championship. Zach then moved on to superkarts in 2013, competing in the SKUSA Pro Tour and SKUSA SuperNationals. In 2014, Zach competed in legends cars in the INEX Winter Nationals series. For the 2016 season, Herrin returned to the SKUSA Pro Tour and SKUSA SuperNationals.

Personal life 
Herrin left the motorsports industry after discovering that he needed time to realize his authentic self as a member of the LGBT community. He began a career in real estate.

Return to racing

ARCA Menards Series 
On January 16, 2022 Herrin began his ARCA series career at the Daytona Pre-Season practice, driving for Fast Track Racing, marking his return to professional racing since coming out. He plans to compete in a limited schedule in the ARCA Menards Series in 2022, then expand to a larger ARCA/NASCAR schedule in 2023.

Racing Pride 
Zach is a member of the founding class of the North American expansion of Racing Pride.

Motorsports career results

ARCA Menards Series
(key) (Bold – Pole position awarded by qualifying time. Italics – Pole position earned by points standings or practice time. * – Most laps led. ** – All laps led.)

ARCA Menards Series West

References

External links 

 
 Zach Herrin Driver Statistics at Racing Reference

1995 births
20th-century American LGBT people
21st-century LGBT people
ARCA Menards Series drivers
American racing drivers
Gay sportsmen
LGBT people from California
LGBT racing drivers
American LGBT sportspeople
Living people
People from Glendale, California
Sportspeople from Glendale, California